Kiha & The Faces (Korean: 장기하와 얼굴들) was a South Korean indie rock band lead by singer Chang Kiha. The band debuted in 2008 with the single, "Cheap Coffee," and have since become one of South Korea's most popular and commercially successful indie rock bands.

Members

Former members
 Chang Kiha - Vocals, Guitar
 Lee Min-ki - Guitar
 Jeong Jung-yeop - Bass guitar
 Lee Jong-min - Keyboard
 Yohei Hasegawa - Guitar
 Jeon Il-jun - Drum
 Mimi Sisters - Dance, Chorus
 Kim Hyeon-ho - Drum

Discography

Studio albums

Singles

Awards and nominations

Cyworld Digital Music Awards

Golden Disc Awards

Korean Music Awards

Mnet Asian Music Awards

Honors 
In 2012, Kiha & The Faces were given the South Korean Minister of Culture, Sports and Tourism Commendation for increasing public interest in indie music through their songs.

References

External links

South Korean indie rock groups
South Korean folk rock groups
Korean Music Award winners
Musical groups established in 2008
Musical groups disestablished in 2018